Gastón Nicolás González (born 27 June 2001) is an Argentine professional footballer who plays as a winger for Orlando City of Major League Soccer.

Club career
González started his career with Unión Santa Fe. He made the breakthrough towards the end of the 2018–19 campaign, featuring for the final ten minutes of a Copa de la Superliga draw away to San Martín on 13 April 2019; having been substituted on by Leonardo Madelón in place of Augusto Lotti. On 21 December 2020, during his seventh career appearance, González scored his first senior goal in a 2–2 draw away to Rosario Central in the Copa de la Liga Profesional.

On 5 May 2022, Orlando City announced the signing of González as an U22 initiative player on a three-year contract with three additional option years although he was immediately placed on the Season Ending Injury list having torn his ACL in what was already scheduled to be his final appearance for Unión on 19 April.

International career
In 2019, González was selected to train against Argentina's senior squad at the Copa América in Brazil.

Career statistics
.

References

External links

2001 births
Living people
Footballers from Santa Fe, Argentina
Argentine footballers
Association football forwards
Argentine Primera División players
Unión de Santa Fe footballers
Orlando City SC players
Expatriate soccer players in the United States
Argentine expatriate sportspeople in the United States